Alisa is a given name.

Alisa may also refer to:

 Alisa (gravure idol) (born 1989), Japanese gravure idol and actress
 Alisa (moth), a synonym for moths of the genus Agriphila
 Alisa (Russian band), a Russian hard rock band
 Alisa (Serbian band), a Serbian and former Yugoslav pop rock band
 Alisa (TV series), an Indonesian soap opera television series
 Alisa (virtual assistant), a virtual assistant developed by Yandex

See also